Richard Renchaw Neill Jr. (November 12, 1875 – April 8, 1970) was an American actor and screenwriter who worked in both the silent and sound eras. He performed in more than 200 films between 1910 and 1959, and during the early part of his long screen career, he wrote "several scenarios" for productions. Born in Philadelphia, Pennsylvania, he died in California, in the Woodland Hills neighborhood of Los Angeles.

Partial filmography

 The Lighthouse by the Sea (1911, Short) - The Lighthouse Keeper's Son
 The Charge of the Light Brigade (1912)
 The Substitute Stenographer (1913, Short)
 Dolly of the Dailies (1914, Serial) - High Officer of the Secret Society [Ch. 5]
 Fantasma (1914) - The Princess' Father
 Colonel Carter of Cartersville (1915) - Robert Gill
 The Broken Law (1915) - Gaspar
 The Labyrinth (1915) - Rev. Herbert Fenton
 The Man Who Found Himself (1915) - Himself, Cameo Appearance (uncredited)
 The Fool's Revenge (1916) - Randall
 A Modern Thelma (1916)
 God's Half Acre (1916) - Perry Westley
 A Wall Street Tragedy (1916) - Ranson
 The Ragged Princess (1916) - Thomas Deigan
 The Battle of Life (1916) - O'Leary
 A Child of the Wild (1917)
 Love's Law (1917)
 The Co-Respondent (1917)
 The Woman in White (1917)
 Her Second Husband (1917)
 The Road to France (1918)
 His Wife's Friend (1919)
 The Plunger (1920)
 Go Get 'Em Hutch (1922)
 A Clouded Name (1923)
 Sinner or Saint (1923)
 Heritage of the Desert (1924)
 The Fighting Coward (1924)
 Wanderer of the Wasteland (1924)
 Percy (1925)
 Tumbleweeds (1925)
 Born to the West (1926)
 Satan Town (1926)
 The Trunk Mystery (1926)
 Galloping Thunder (1927)
 The Fightin' Comeback (1927)
 The Desert of the Lost (1927)
 Bulldog Pluck (1927)
 Somewhere in Sonora (1927)
 The Man Without a Face (1928)
 Beyond the Sierras (1928)
 The Law's Lash (1928)
 The Bushranger (1928)
 The King of the Kongo (1929)
 Where East is East (1929)
 The Last Frontier (1932)
 Jiggs and Maggie in Court (1948)

References

External links

1875 births
1970 deaths
American male film actors
American male silent film actors
20th-century American male actors
Male actors from Philadelphia